Hovorbis is a genus of air-breathing freshwater snails in the family Planorbidae, the ram's horn snails and their allies.

Species
 Hovorbis coretus (de Blainville, 1826)
 Hovorbis crassilabrum (Morelet, 1860)
 Hovorbis rodriguezensis (Crosse, 1873)
 Hovorbis starmuehlneri (Brown, 1980)

References

External links
 Brown D.S. & Mandahl-Barth G. (1973). TWO NEW GENERA OF PLANORBIDAE FROM AFRICA AND MADAGASCAR. Journal of Molluscan Studies. 40: 287-302

 
Planorbidae
Gastropod genera